Sangita Myska is a British television and radio presenter and journalist. She currently hosts an early afternoon weekend phone-in show on LBC Radio.

Early life
Born in Tanzania, Myska is of African and Indian heritage and speaks Marathi and, to a lesser extent, Hindi. She was educated at Claremont High School in London and at the University of Birmingham, where she was awarded an upper second class LLB degree in Law and Politics.

Career

BBC radio and television
Myska began her career as a member of the BBC News trainee reporter scheme, specializing in radio. She served the final attachment of her apprenticeship at BBC Radio Sheffield, where she was initially employed as a staff reporter and then as a producer on the channel's Drivetime show (hosted by Dean "Pips" Pepall). After learning her craft in local broadcasting, she was promoted to a national role as a producer for BBC Radio Five Live, and then to a production position on Five Live's television equivalent, BBC News 24. Her first appearance in front of the camera was in 1997, when she began working as a news reporter for BBC Scotland.

After winning the BBC's Talent competition in 2001, Myska made her national television debut in BBC One's long-running Holiday travel show, subsequently appearing too in one of its many spin-offs, Summer Holiday. In 2002, she returned to BBC News as a correspondent on BBC One's national bulletins. That same year saw her on BBC Two fronting a six-part undercover investigation into car crime and consumer fraud. In February 2003, she was one of the three presenter-reporters assigned to anchor a 15-minute 7:45 p.m. weekday news programme on the BBC's new channel aimed at young viewers, BBC Three. She reverted to working on the BBC's main bulletins in March 2004.

Myska was invited to join Channel 5's news team in 2005, but elected to remain with the BBC. In 2008, she led an undercover investigation into child trafficking in Bulgaria. Her exposé led to her being invited to assist the United Nations Office on Drugs and Crime in its efforts to bring trafficking to an end. The many other shows on BBC television to which she contributed included Sian Williams's BBC One religious current affairs programme, Sunday Morning Live; The Daily Politics with Andrew Neil on BBC Two; Real Story with Fiona Bruce on BBC One; Outrageous Fortunes: Guinness on BBC One and BBC Three; Lifting the Bonnet, a current affairs series, on BBC Two; World Olympic Dreams: Mongolia Rising on BBC One; The One Show, also on BBC One; and the current affairs series 4X4.

Myska's work on the BBC's flagship radio channel, BBC Radio 4, featured a spell on its early morning news programme, Today, and also several high-profile documentary and current affairs programmes. Among them were Positive Thinking, both presented and co-created by her, a 9 a.m. weekday show about problem solving; the human interest show Lives in a Landscape; What's in a Name, an exploration of the pride and prejudice associated with having a foreign-sounding name in contemporary Britain; A Family Without a Child, a programme relating the experiences of childless British women; The Hidden Story of British Slavery, a programme about the persistence of a form of slavery in Britain in the 21st century; and an investigation of the poor working conditions of domiciliary carers and the other troubles of the British social care system. She also presented the podcast that the BBC dedicated to the daily proceedings of the public inquiry into the Grenfell Tower fire.

LBC
It was reported in February 2022 that Myska was one of the many BBC presenters who had left the Corporation in order to work in the private sector. On 11 June 2022, she began hosting a weekend phone-in show for LBC Radio, broadcasting between 1 p.m. and 4 p.m. in a slot formerly occupied by the Muslim activist Maajid Nawaz.

Awards
In 2007, European Voice magazine named Myska as one of Europe's fifty most influential people because of the light that she had shed on child trafficking. Her work on the issue also won her a place on the longlist of the 2007 Amnesty International Journalism Awards. In 2012, the Women of the Future Programme (International) named her Asian Woman of the Year in the Media, again because of her trafficking report, but also because of her coverage of the London riots of 2011 and their aftermath. In 2014, her radio work on the consequences of childlessness was acknowledged by a place among the finalists for the Journalist of the Year and Investigation of the Year awards bestowed by the Asian Media Group.

Personal life
In 2009, Myska began volunteering for the Akanksha Foundation, training boys in the use of journalism to serve their community.

In September 2009, it was revealed that she had been mugged the previous year by Daniel Mykoo and his brother Matthew, dubbed the London "strangler-robbers."

References

Living people
British television presenters
British reporters and correspondents
BBC newsreaders and journalists
Year of birth missing (living people)
British people of Indian descent
British people of Punjabi descent